Vine snake can refer to several genera of snake in the taxonomic family Colubridae:

 Ahaetulla, a genus of Asiatic vine snakes
 Chironius, a genus, Sipos or blunt-headed vine snakes
 Imantodes, a genus of neotropical vine snakes
 Oxybelis, a genus of neotropical vine snakes
 Thelotornis, a genus of African vine snakes also known as twig snakes

Animal common name disambiguation pages